Emilio Miller Garza (born August 1, 1947) is a former United States circuit judge of the United States Court of Appeals for the Fifth Circuit and former United States District Judge of the United States District Court for the Western District of Texas.

Education and career

Born in San Antonio, Texas, Garza graduated from the University of Notre Dame in 1969, receiving a Bachelor of Arts degree there in 1969 and a Master of Arts in 1970. He then joined the United States Marine Corps, in which he was an officer from 1970 to 1973. Garza earned his Juris Doctor at the University of Texas School of Law in 1976. He was an attorney in private practice with the law firm of Clemens, Spencer, Welmaker & Fink in San Antonio between 1976 and 1986. He was a Judge of the Bexar County, Texas Two Hundred and Twenty-Fifth District Court from 1987 to 1988

Federal judicial service

On February 2, 1988, President Ronald Reagan nominated Garza to the United States District Court for the Western District of Texas, to fill the seat vacated by William S. Sessions. The Senate confirmed Garza's nomination on April 19, 1988, and Garza received his commission the following day. His service terminated on June 7, 1991, due to elevation to the Fifth Circuit.

On April 11, 1991, President George H. W. Bush nominated Garza to a seat on the United States Court of Appeals for the Fifth Circuit vacated by Thomas Morrow Reavley, and he was confirmed by the Senate on May 24, 1991, receiving his commission on May 30, 1991. Judge Garza assumed senior status August 1, 2012 and retired on January 5, 2015.

Supreme Court consideration

Garza was mentioned as a potential nominee to the United States Supreme Court. In fact, he was interviewed in 1991 for the vacancy created by the retirement of Justice Thurgood Marshall. That seat ultimately went to Justice Clarence Thomas.

Notable opinions

Special concurrence in Fisher v. University of Texas, 631 F.3d 213 (5th Cir. 2011)
Strong dissent in Fisher v. University of Texas, 758 F.3d 633 (5th Cir. 2014)
Dissenting from denial of rehearing en banc in Reliable Consultants, Inc. v. Earle, 538 F.3d 355 (5th Cir. 2008)
Majority opinion in Comacho v. Texas Workforce Commission, 408 F.3d 229 (5th Cir. 2005)
Majority opinion in U.S. v. Bird, 401 F.3d 633 (5th Cir. 2005)
Majority opinion in Wallace v. County of Comal, 400 F.3d 284 (5th Cir. 2005)
Majority opinion in Sierra Club v. Peterson, 228 F.3d 559 (5th Cir. 2000) (en banc)
Majority opinion in Atwater v. City of Lago Vista, 195 F.3d 242 (5th Cir. 1999) (en banc)
Majority opinion in United States v. Navarro, 169 F.3d 228 (5th Cir. 1999)
Majority opinion in United States v. Castillo, 179 F.3d 321 (5th Cir. 1999)
Special concurrence in Flores v. Johnson, 210 F.3d 456 (2000)
Special concurrence in Causeway Med. Suite v. Ieyoub, 109 F.3d 1096 (5th Cir. 1997)
Concurring opinion Doe v. Hillsboro Independent School District, 113 F.3d 1412 (5th Cir. 1997)(en banc)

In 2010, Judge Garza joined Judges Edith Brown Clement and Priscilla Owen in affirming the dismissal of the complaint in Doe v. Silsbee Independent School District. The plaintiff ("H.S.") was a cheerleader who was ordered by her high school to cheer for her alleged rapist, a basketball player named Rakheem Bolton. H.S. refused and was kicked off the team. She sued, claiming a violation of her First Amendment right to free speech. The Eastern District of Texas, Judge Thad Heartfield, granted the school district's motion to dismiss, and Judges Clement, Garza, and Owen affirmed. H.S. was ordered to pay the school $45,000 in legal fees for filing a "frivolous" lawsuit.

See also
List of Hispanic/Latino American jurists
George H. W. Bush Supreme Court candidates
George W. Bush Supreme Court candidates

References

Sources
Material on this page is taken or adapted from the U.S. Department of Justice Office of Legal Policy, and from the Fifth Circuit Library System of the United States Court of Appeals, both public domain sources.
Fifth Circuit Library System of the United States Court of Appeals
U.S. Department of Justice Office of Legal Policy

External links

1947 births
Hispanic and Latino American judges
Judges of the United States Court of Appeals for the Fifth Circuit
Judges of the United States District Court for the Western District of Texas
Living people
People from San Antonio
United States court of appeals judges appointed by George H. W. Bush
United States district court judges appointed by Ronald Reagan
20th-century American judges
University of Notre Dame alumni
University of Texas School of Law alumni